Sur (South) is a 1988 Argentine drama film written and directed by Fernando E. Solanas.  The film features Susú Pecoraro, Miguel Ángel Solá, Philippe Léotard, Lito Cruz, Ulises Dumont among others.

Following its debut at the 1988 Cannes Film Festival, Sur has collected a host of awards from prestigious international film festivals. Sur garnered its director, Fernando E. Solanas the Best Director at Cannes in 1988 and was nominated for the Palme d'Or in the same year. The film was selected to be screened in the Cannes Classics section of the 2015 Cannes Film Festival.

In a survey of the 100 greatest films of Argentine cinema carried out by the Museo del Cine Pablo Ducrós Hicken in 2000, the film reached the 33rd position. In a new version of the survey organized in 2022 by the specialized magazines La vida útil, Taipei and La tierra quema, presented at the Mar del Plata International Film Festival, the film reached the 40th position.

Plot 
Floreal is released from prison prior to the end of a military coup d'état in 1983. He discovers his wife has cheated on him and is not sure he wants to return to his former life and family. A friend, "El-Negro", who was killed during the military coup, appears in the night with a special mission: to help Floreal face what has happened when he was serving time in prison. El-Negro helps him to live through the important events that happened in his absence. El-Negro helps him get past his anger, understanding how hard it was to endure such a difficult time and how the military coup had crushed people's lives. When El-Negro finally tells him he must return, Floreal realizes he must be strong and, like his coup-stricken country, pick up and go on with his life.

Cast 
 Susú Pecoraro as Rosi Echegoyen
 Miguel Ángel Solá as Floreal Echegoyen
 Philippe Léotard as Roberto
 Lito Cruz as El Negro
 Ulises Dumont as Emilio
 Roberto Goyeneche as Amado
 Gabriela Toscano as Blondi
 Mario Lozano as Echegoyen
 Nathán Pinzón as Rasatti
 Antonio Ameijeiras as Peregrino
 Inés Molina as María
 Fito Páez as Marcelo
 Niní Gambier as Adela
 Chany Mallo as Floreal's mother
 Susana Mayo as Cora
 Ricardo Alaniz as Arturito
 Luis Romero as Yacumin

Awards 
Wins
 1988 Cannes Film Festival: Best Director Award, Fernando Solanas (Prix de la mise en scène), Audience Award, Fernando Solanas 1988.
 Flanders International Film Festival: Georges Delerue Award, Ástor Piazzolla
 Havana Film Festival:Grand Coral - First Prize, Fernando Solanas

Nominations 
 1988 Cannes Film Festival: Golden Palm (Fernando Solana)

References

External links 
 
 Sur at the cinenacional.com 

1988 films
1988 drama films
Argentine independent films
1980s Spanish-language films
Films shot in Buenos Aires
Films set in Buenos Aires
Films directed by Fernando Solanas
Georges Delerue Award winners
Argentine drama films
1988 independent films